The Prix Ahmadou-Kourouma is a Swiss literary prize in French language literature created in 2004, awarded annually by the Geneva International Book and Press Fair. The prize, named after Ivorian writer Ahmadou Kourouma, is given to a fiction or essay book on sub-Saharan Africa.

Prize winners

References

Fiction awards
Swiss literary awards
Awards established in 2004
French-language literary awards
2004 establishments in Switzerland